Fire Station No. 7 is a historic fire station located at South Bend, St. Joseph County, Indiana.  It was built in 1904, and is a -story, Queen Anne style brick building with a Shingle Style upper story.  It was used as a fire station until 1968, after which it was adapted for community uses.

It was listed on the National Register of Historic Places in 1999.

References

Fire stations on the National Register of Historic Places in Indiana
Queen Anne architecture in Indiana
Government buildings completed in 1904
Buildings and structures in South Bend, Indiana
Houses in St. Joseph County, Indiana
National Register of Historic Places in St. Joseph County, Indiana